Cindy Neighbor (March 31, 1941) is a current Democratic member of the Kansas House of Representatives, who represents the 18th district. She first served from 2003 to 2004 as a Republican, and then served as a Democrat from 2007 to 2011. Neighbor ran for re-election in 2010 and was defeated by Republican John Rubin. Neighbor ran again in 2016 and reclaimed her seat, from Erik Jenkins, the Republican who ran to replace the retiring Rubin.

Neighbor, who attended Johnson County Community College and Kansas City Kansas Community College, has worked as a medical administrator as well as a Public Relations and marketing director.

She has served as Parent Teacher Association President and was on the founding committee of the Ronald McDonald House at the University of Kansas Medical Center.  She is also a member of the Board of Indigent Defense Services, Kansas State Board of Education, and the Teacher Credentialing Board.

Committee membership - 2018 Session
 Committee on Insurance, Ranking Minority Member
 Committee on Agriculture
 Committee on General Government Budget

Major donors
The top 5 donors to Neighbor's 2008 campaign:
1. Helena Whitlock Revocable Trust 	$20,000
2. AT&T 	$1,500 	
3. Kansans for Lifesaving Cures 	$1,000	
4. Kansas National Education Assoc 	$1,000
5. Kansas Medical Society 	$1,000

References

External links
 Official Website
 Kansas Legislature - Cindy Neighbor
 Project Vote Smart profile
 Kansas Votes profile
 Follow the Money campaign contributions: 2002, 2004, 2006, 2008

Members of the Kansas House of Representatives
1941 births
Living people
Women state legislators in Kansas
Johnson County Community College people
Kansas Republicans
Kansas Democrats
21st-century American politicians
21st-century American women politicians